Tetraulax pictiventris is a species of beetle in the family Cerambycidae. It was described by Chevrolat in 1857.

References

Tetraulaxini
Beetles described in 1857
Taxa named by Louis Alexandre Auguste Chevrolat